Old Belses is a village by the Ale Water, in the Parish of Ancrum, in the Scottish Borders of  Scotland, in the historic county of Roxburghshire.

Other placenames relating to Belses include Belses Mill, Belses Muir and New Belses.

Belses was a station on the Waverley Line.

See also
Belses
List of places in the Scottish Borders
List of places in Scotland

External links

RCAHMS record for Old Belses

Villages in the Scottish Borders